The 1920 Syracuse Orangemen football team represented Syracuse University in the 1920 college football season. The team was led by first-year head coach Chick Meehan.

Schedule

References

Syracuse
Syracuse Orange football seasons
Syracuse Orangemen football